NGC 5291 is a system of interacting galaxies in the constellation Centaurus. It is surrounded by a collisional ring, containing a young and star-forming tidal dwarf galaxy, where dark matter has been detected.

See also
 Spitzer Space Telescope

References

External links
 Spitzer Space Telescope page on NGC 5291
 detailed info. on NGC 5291
 Link to NGC 5291

5291
48893
Centaurus (constellation)
Interacting galaxies
Elliptical galaxies